The Achaemenid Persian Lion Rhyton (in Persian:"تکوک شیر غران") is an ancient artifact related to Achaemenians. 
A rhyton is a kind of vessel which normally terminates in the shape of an animal's head or horns. These vessels were common in the Near East and ancient Greece.

Early Iranians used rhyta with an animal head at the end of the vessel; later in the Achaemenid period the animal part of the rhyton was usually located in front of it and at a 90 degree angle to the vessel.

The rhyton was created in circa 500 B.C by some estimates. It is 6.7 in. height (about 17 cm.) and is constructed entirely from gold. The different parts of the artefact are joined together by soldering, done so skilfully as to leave no obvious marks. 

This lion head creature was found by Fletcher Fund in 1954 in southwest Persia and is now located in the Metropolitan Museum of Art in New York City, United States.

References

Archaeology of the Achaemenid Empire
Persian art
Gold objects
1954 in Iran
Archaeological discoveries in Iran
1954 archaeological discoveries